Ālavī or Āṭavī was an ancient kingdom of central South Asia whose existence is attested during the Iron Age. The inhabitants of Ālavī, called the Ālavakas, were of non-Indo-Aryan origin.

Location
Ālavī was a small state located near the Gaṅgā river. Alexander Cunningham and Vincent Arthur Smith identified Ālavī with the Ġāzīpur region.

The name of the state was derived from that of its capital, named Ālabhiyā, or Ālavī (in Pāli) or Āṭavī (in Sanskrit), which lied on the road between Kosala's capital of Sāvatthī and Magadha's capital of Rājagaha, and was located thirty  from Sāvatthī and twelve  from Varanasi.

History
During Mahāvīra's time, Ālavī was inhabited by Ṛṣibhadraputra and the s.

The Buddha often visited Ālavī, especially the Aggalāva  which was located in its capital city.

References

Further reading

Ancient peoples of India